Nu'aym ibn al-Waddah al-Azdi was a ninth century military commander and governor of the Yemen for the Abbasid Caliphate.

Nu'aym is mentioned as one of Tahir ibn al-Husayn's commanders during the Siege of Baghdad (812–813), when he was sent by Tahir to garrison a southern suburb of the city. Subsequently he was appointed as governor, along with al-Muzaffar ibn Yahya al-Kindi, of the Yemen in 821, and during their co-governorship the two shared joint administration of the country, with Nu'aym exercising authority in Sana'a and al-Muzaffar in al-Janad. They remained in control over the Yemen until al-Muzaffar died, after which Nu'aym was replaced with Muhammad ibn 'Abdallah ibn Muhriz.

Notes

References 
 
 
 
 

Abbasid governors of Yemen
9th-century people from the Abbasid Caliphate
9th-century Arabs
Fourth Fitna
9th century in Yemen